The Innovation Party (YP) is a Turkish political party founded under the leadership of Öztürk Yılmaz, also currently serving as its chairman, on 20 July 2020.

History

Formation

The party founder is Öztürk Yılmaz, who was a member of parliament for the CHP in both 2015 and 2018, who was expelled from the party on 20 November 2018 when he demanded that the adhān (call to prayer) should be in Turkish instead of Arabic. Another reason for his expulsion from the party were statements against the party leader Kemal Kılıçdaroğlu. In 2019 he then announced that he wanted to found his own party. Since its foundation in July 2020, the party has, with Yılmaz, a seat in the Turkish National Assembly.

References

External links 
 Official website

Political parties established in 2020
Social democratic parties in Turkey